Podolsk Urban Okrug ("Big Podolsk") — municipal divisions, located southeast of Moscow Oblast Russia. Its administrative division and center is the city of Podolsk.
Urban district territory includes the city of Podolsk and 75 rural localities - selos, villages, rural-type settlements included in the district in 2015 with the abolition of the Podolsk district.

Geography 
Total Area: 339,11 km2:
rural area 275,22 km2, 
city area- 69,89 km2

Urban okrugs of Moscow Oblast